Carlos Estévez is the birth name of Charlie Sheen (born 1965), an American actor.

Carlos Estévez may also refer to:
Maximiliano Estévez (Carlos Maximiliano Estévez, born 1977), Argentine footballer
Carlos Estévez (baseball) (born 1992), Dominican baseball player
Carlos Estévez (artist) (born 1969), Cuban visual and ceramic artist